A. T. Myers  was an American football coach.  He served as the head football coach at Wake Forest University for one season in 1909, compiling a record of 2–4. He was an alumnus of Harvard University; reports differ on exactly where and when he played.  Most sources claimed he played as an end (sometimes more specifically the right end) during the 1907 season, however others wrote that he played a combination of tackle and fullback from 1901 to 1905 for the Crimson, and spent the 1906 season coaching the Harvard freshman team.

Head coaching record

References

Year of birth missing
Year of death missing
Wake Forest Demon Deacons football coaches
Harvard University alumni